Shōhei, Shohei or Shouhei (written: 昌平, 昇平, 翔平, 祥平, 祥兵, 正平, 宗平, 将平, 頌平, 章平, 勝平 or 尚平) is a masculine Japanese given name. Notable people with the name include:

, Japanese footballer
, Japanese footballer
, Japanese professional wrestler
, Japanese manga artist
Shohei Hoshino, Japanese badminton player
, Japanese footballer
, Japanese film director
, Japanese modern pentathlete
, Japanese footballer
, Japanese discus thrower
, Japanese hammer thrower
, Japanese baseball player
, Japanese footballer
, Japanese footballer
, Japanese footballer
, Japanese actor and model
, Japanese footballer
, Japanese footballer
, Japanese footballer
, Japanese footballer
, Japanese writer, literary critic, and translator
, Japanese baseball player
Shohei Otomo (born 1980), Japanese artist
, Japanese footballer
, Japanese astronomer
, Japanese shogi player
, Japanese footballer
, Japanese baseball player
, Japanese baseball player
, Japanese ski jumper
, Japanese footballer
, Japanese footballer
, Japanese footballer

Japanese masculine given names